Gan Mei Yan (born 9 June 1984) is a Malaysian radio announcer at Astro Radio, actress, TV and event host, brand ambassador, and influencer. She was born in Petaling Jaya, West Malaysia. Gan started her entertainment career in 2004, at the age of 19, with MY and has hosted numerous events, shows, and ceremonies. She has appeared in various feature films, television programs and shows, music videos, online advertisements, and television commercials.

Career
Gan graduated from Tunku Abdul Rahman University College with a Diploma of Media Study. She started her career at the age of 19 when she was chosen to be the host of TV program Fan Miu Dai Gik Jin on Astro Wah Lai Toi. In 2004, Gan switched careers to become a radio announcer at MY.

Currently, she is a breakfast announcer of MY Yong Guong Can Lan from 6 to 10am on weekdays. She is also the leading female announcer in MY (Astro Radio Sdn Bhd).

Other than radio, Gan hosts dinner shows, artist showcases, artist fans meeting, live shows, concerts, press conferences, and client's events. Additionally, she is also a social media influencer with more than 150,000 followers on Instagram and 430,000 likes on Facebook. She shares her lifestyle and interacts with her fans and followers via social media platforms.

Besides, Gan debuted in the Malaysian feature film Tiger Woo Hoo and played Ah Lian role, which were presented by Malaysia ASTRO in 2010 and her performance was remarkable. In the following year, she received more performance opportunities and featured in many Malaysian feature films, such as Xiao Yong Chun, Great Day, Ah Beng the Movie: 3 wishes, 3x Trouble, and many more.

MY Yong Guong Can Lan
MY – Yong Guong Can Lan is the most popular Chinese radio program in Malaysia. From AC Nielsen's and GSK market research on Malaysian listener's behaviour, MY have been achieving the highest listenership since year 1996. Many have credited the program's No.1 rating as due to her creativity, energy, and powerful voice seen throughout her breakfast show.

Personal life
Gan has been married to Eddie Lee since 17 May 2013 and is a mother of two children, Jo and Sum.

Filmography

Film

Television programme (Host)

Endorsement

References

External links

 
 
 
 萧慧敏颜薇恩-当醒目媳妇过好年

1984 births
Living people
Malaysian television people
Malaysian radio announcers